Caroline Hayes may refer to:
Caroline C. Hayes, American computer scientist and mechanical engineer
Caroline Hayes (actress), English stage and television actress
Caroline Hayes, former principal of Tendring Technology College, an English secondary school

See also
Carolyn Hayes (born 1988), Irish triathlete